The Hadavand tribe (also Romanized as Hedāvand) is a Lur tribe residing in Tehran province and adjacent regions.

Dispersion
Hadavand people mostly live in Tehran Province, specially in Varamin region, including Varamin, Pishva, Pakdasht, Qarchak, other regions in Tehran province such as Shemiranat, Damavand, Robat Karim, Tehran, Karaj and Lar. There is also a Hadavand population in Garmsar in Semnan province.

Population
Hadavand population have been as follows:

Origins and history
Hadavand people have been categorized as a branch of Lor people. In Landlord and peasant in Persia, Ann Lambton mentions Hadavand people as nomad people originally from Khorramabad. also in the book Rustic & tribal weaves from Varamin, Parviz Tanavoli mentions Hadavands as Lor people while comparing Hadavand weaves with people of Lorestan and also quoting the oral history of the Hadavand as told they were a tribe who were moved from Lorestan to Fars by Karim Khan Zand and then moved to Tehran by Agha Mohammad Khan Qajar A similar version of the migration story is mentioned by Iraj Afshar Sistani in his book, Moqaddame-i bar shenakht-e il-ha, chadorneshinan va tavayef-e Iran. In the book, Contemporary Society: Tribal Studies, Hadavand is categorized as Lur-i  Kuchak branch of Lor people. Iranica also mentions Hadavands as Lor people. There is also a mention of a Kurdish origin by Masoud Keyhan and a Lak origin.

Culture
William O. Douglas narrates in his book Strange Lands and Friendly People about his encounter with the Hadavand tribe. The tribe is described as 75 families living in tents while a khan or a chief leads the tribe. He describes a Hadavand welcoming ceremony which includes a copper tray filled with hot coals raised to the guest. He describes Hadavand women as unveiled and, though shy and retiring, friendly. He mentions that economically Hadavands are dependent on goats, sheep, their dairy products and exchange of the produce with adjacent towns and cities.

Subdivisions
Hadavands were originally divided into three main tâyefes (clan), each subsequently divided into groups known as tire. Nowadays, the name of the tribe, tâyefe, tire, or a combination of them makes up common surnames of Hadavands.

References

Tehran Province
Luri tribes
Pakdasht County
Pishva County
Qarchak County
Garmsar County
Varamin County
Nomadic groups in Iran